Gary Lugassy (born 20 August 1982) is a former professional tennis player from France.

Biography
A left handed player, Lugassy began touring professionally in 2003. During his career he regularly featured in the qualifying draws of all four Grand Slam competitions, 12 times in total, but was never able to progress into the main tournament. He won the doubles event with Alessandro Gravina at the 2006 Challenger de Granby, his only Challenger title. At the same Granby Challenger tournament in 2007 he won a match against Milos Raonic, who was making his first ever appearance at that level. His highest ranking, 194 in the world, was attained in October 2007.

Challenger titles

Doubles: (1)

References

External links
 
 

1982 births
Living people
French male tennis players